Fairmont City is a village in St. Clair and Madison counties, Illinois, United States. The population was 2,265 at the 2020 census, down from 2,635 in 2010. In the 1990s Fairmont City's Hispanic population doubled, and as of 2020, over 79% of the population was of Hispanic descent.

Geography
Fairmont City is located in northwestern St. Clair County at  (38.651200, -90.099788). A small part of the village extends north into southwestern Madison County. The community is bordered to the northwest by Brooklyn, to the north by Madison, to the northeast by Pontoon Beach, to the east by Collinsville, to the southeast by Caseyville, to the south by Washington Park, and to the southwest by East St. Louis. The village limits extend west  from the main portion of Fairmont City to touch the Mississippi River directly across from St. Louis.

Fairmont City is built atop portions of the Cahokia Mounds, a UNESCO World Heritage Site. Sam Chucalo Mound, one of the mounds, is in the western part of the village. Other mounds are in the eastern part of the village within Cahokia Mounds State Historic Site.

In April 2016, the US Environmental Protection Agency added the Old American Zinc Fairmont City site to the National Priorities List following the Illinois EPA discovering high levels of lead, arsenic, cadmium and zinc in soil samples. Collected soil samples from properties and alleyways showed residue of arsenic, cadmium and zinc.

Sunset often provides picturesque views of the arch and St. Louis' skyline. Collinsville Road runs the length of the village. This route once contained an accumulation of vintage, in situ roadside Americana advertising signage, most of which has not been removed or destroyed over time.

National City, a former company town to the west of Fairmont City, dissolved in 1997 and was annexed by Fairmont City.

Demographics

As of the census of 2000, there were 2,436 people, 871 households, and 580 families residing in the village. The racial makeup of the village was 41.54% White, 1.23% African American, 0.94% Native American, 0.08% Asian, 27.50% from other races, and 3.69% from two or more races. Hispanic or Latino of any race were 55.38% of the population.

There were 871 households, out of which 29.9% had children under the age of 18 living with them, 45.9% were married couples living together, 11.7% had a female householder with no husband present, and 33.4% were non-families. 29.2% of all households were made up of individuals, and 14.7% had someone living alone who was 65 years of age or older. The average household size was 2.80 and the average family size was 3.45.

In the village, the population was spread out, with 26.7% under the age of 18, 11.7% from 18 to 24, 28.7% from 25 to 44, 18.6% from 45 to 64, and 14.2% who were 65 years of age or older. The median age was 32 years. For every 100 females, there were 116.0 males. For every 100 females age 18 and over, there were 114.7 males.

The median income for a household in the village was $27,070, and the median income for a family was $31,296. Males had a median income of $21,766 versus $21,576 for females. The per capita income for the village was $12,203. About 14.7% of families and 18.4% of the population were below the poverty line, including 26.5% of those under age 18 and 10.7% of those age 65 or over.

Village services
The Fairmont City Library was International Grand Prize First Place for the Libraryaware for Library-community interaction in 2017, beating out the Kansas City Public Library and Catawba County Library in North Carolina.

Notable people
Johnny Wyrostek, baseball player and Fairmont City Mayor from 1967 till his death in 1986.

References

External links 
 

Villages in St. Clair County, Illinois
Villages in Madison County, Illinois
Villages in Illinois